Seven ships of the Royal Navy have borne the name HMS Violet, after the flower of the genus viola:

  was a ship present in the fleet sent against the Spanish Armada in 1588. She may have been a hired vessel.
  was a 44-gun ship captured in 1652 and broken up in 1672.
  was a lugger transferred from HM Customs in 1806 and broken up in 1812.
  was a tender purchased in 1835 and sold in 1842.
  was an iron paddle packet ship launched in 1845 and sold in 1854.
  was an  wood screw gunboat launched in 1856 and sold in 1864.
  was a  launched in 1940 and sold into mercantile service in 1947.

Royal Navy ship names